Ignacy Mościcki (1 December 18672 October 1946) was a Polish chemist and politician who was the country's president from 1926 to 1939. He was the longest serving president in Polish history.

Early life and career
Mościcki was born on 1 December 1867 in Mierzanowo, a small village near Ciechanów, Congress Poland. After completing school in Warsaw, he studied chemistry at the Riga Polytechnicum, where he joined the Polish underground leftist organization, Proletariat.

Upon graduating, he returned to Warsaw but was threatened by the Tsarist secret police with life imprisonment in Siberia and was forced to emigrate in 1892 to London. In 1896, he was offered an assistantship at the University of Fribourg in Switzerland. There he patented a method for cheap industrial production of nitric acid.

In 1912, Mościcki moved to Lviv, in the Kingdom of Galicia and Lodomeria, in Austria-Hungary, where he accepted a chair in physical chemistry and technical electrochemistry at the Lviv Polytechnic. In 1925, he was elected rector of the Lwów Polytechnic (as it was then called), but soon moved to Warsaw to continue his research at the Warsaw Polytechnic. In 1926, he became an Honorary Member of the Polish Chemical Society.

Presidency

After Józef Piłsudski's May 1926 coup d'état on 1 June 1926, Mościcki, once an associate of Piłsudski in the Polish Socialist Party, was elected President of Poland by the National Assembly on the recommendation of Piłsudski, who had refused the post for himself.

As president, Mościcki was subservient to Piłsudski and never openly showed dissent from any aspect of the Marshal's leadership. After Piłsudski's death in 1935, his followers divided into three main factions: those supporting Mościcki as Piłsudski's successor, those supporting General Edward Rydz-Śmigły and those supporting Prime Minister Walery Sławek.

With a view to eliminating Sławek from the game, Mościcki concluded a power-sharing agreement with Rydz-Śmigły, which had caused Sławek to be marginalised as a serious political player by the end of the year. As a result of the agreement, Rydz-Śmigły would become the de facto leader of Poland until the outbreak of the war, and Mościcki remained influential by continuing in office as president.

Mościcki was the leading moderate figure in the regime, which was referred to as the "colonels' government" because of the major presence of military officers in the Polish government. Mościcki opposed many of the nationalist excesses of the more right-wing Rydz-Śmigły, but their pact remained more or less intact.

Mościcki remained president until September 1939, when he was interned in Romania after the German invasion of Poland and was forced by France to resign his office. He transferred the office to General Bolesław Wieniawa-Długoszowski, who held it for only one day before General Władysław Sikorski and the French government ousted him in favour of Władysław Raczkiewicz.

Later life

Mościcki was planning to leave for Switzerland after leaving office as president. From 1908 to 1920, he was a citizen of Switzerland; he was also an honorary citizen of Fribourg. The Romanian authorities gave their provisional consent to his departure, but Germany opposed it. Mościcki was offered to United States President Franklin Roosevelt, who was determined to have Mościcki go to Switzerland. The intervention of the US government forced the Romanian authorities to agree. General Sikorski also ordered the Polish embassy in Bucharest to provide all assistance to Mościcki. The president stayed in Romania until December 1939.

Mościcki came to Switzerland through Milan, where he met with Wieniawa-Długoszowski. Initially, he lived in Fribourg, where he was allowed to continue his scientific work. During this period, among others, he wrote down his memories, which were published by the New York City magazine Independence. Mościcki donated money to soldiers of the Polish Army in France, Warsaw residents in prisoner-of-war camps, concentration camps and labour camps. For five months, he taught at the University of Fribourg. Later, he was forced to take up paid work. In 1940, he moved to Geneva, where he worked in the Hydro-Nitro Chemical Laboratory.

Mościcki's health deteriorated rapidly after 1943. He died on 2 October 1946, in Versoix, near Geneva.

Legacy
In 1984, his descendants requested for the remains of Mościcki and his wife to be moved from Switzerland to Poland. The relevant Polish authorities agreed that a funeral was to be held in Warsaw and be completely private, without any state ceremonies. However, the authorities of the Canton of Geneva in Switzerland withdrew their agreement for political reasons after protests related to Solidarity from emigrants. In 1993, Mościcki's remains were transported, on behalf of incumbent President Lech Wałęsa, to Poland and deposited in the crypt of St. John's Archcathedral, Warsaw. Mościcki's symbolic grave is located in the Avenue of Merit at the Powązki Cemetery in Warsaw, where his second wife is buried next to him.

Gallery

See also
 Invasion of Poland
 Mościce
 List of Poles

Notes

External links
 
 
 
 

|-

1867 births
1946 deaths
People from Ciechanów County
People from Płock Governorate
Polish Socialist Party politicians
Presidents of Poland
Polish physical chemists
Polish inventors
People of the Polish May Coup (pro-Piłsudski side)
Members of the Lwów Scientific Society
Lviv Polytechnic rectors
19th-century Polish politicians
20th-century Polish politicians
Riga Technical University alumni
Burials at St. John's Archcathedral, Warsaw
Recipients of the Order of the White Eagle (Poland)